The 2017–18 Czech National Football League was the 25th season of the Czech Republic's second tier football league.

Team changes

Promoted team Olympia Hradec Králové moved from Hradec Králové to Prague and was renamed as Olympia Prague.

From FNL

 Sigma Olomouc (promoted to 2017–18 Czech First League)
 Baník Ostrava (promoted to 2017–18 Czech First League)
 Prostějov (relegated to 2017–18 Moravian–Silesian Football League)

To FNL

 Hradec Králové (relegated from 2016–17 Czech First League)
 Příbram (relegated from 2016–17 Czech First League)
 Olympia (promoted from 2016–17 Bohemian Football League)

Frýdek-Místek (15th place in 2016–17 FNL) were spared from relegation after Moravian–Silesian Football League winners SK Uničov and the next three best-placed teams in that league refused promotion.

Team overview

League table

Results
Each team plays home-and-away against every other team in the league, for a total of 30 matches played each.

See also
 2017–18 Czech First League
 2017–18 Czech Cup

References

Czech National Football League seasons
Czech Republic
Czech National Football League